Ivorian Industrial Development Bank (Fr: Banque Ivoirienne de Developpement Industriel) (BIDI) was a development finance institution in Ivory Coast that operated between 1965 and 1989. It advanced long term and medium term loans to medium and large scale enterprises in Ivory Coast and was a leader in the field up to is liquidation in July 1989.

History 
The bank began operations in 1965 as a joint venture between the Ivorian government, Chase Manhattan Bank, Lazard Freres and other foreign financial institutions. Key objectives were to stimulate capital investment in the country and increase private investment in the industrial sector. Early in its operations, it obtained financing from USAID, the Canadian International Development Agency and the German, KfW Bankengruppe. Between 1965 and 1976, it made loans totaling over $100 million to about 224 medium and large scale enterprises.

However, by early 1988, it had a large percentage of non performing loans on its books and it was liquidated in 1989.

References 

Economy of Ivory Coast
Banks of Ivory Coast